İbrahim Halil Yaşar (born 21 January 1994) is a Turkish footballer who plays as a midfielder for Kırıkhanspor. He made his Süper Lig debut on 19 January 2013.

References

External links
 İbrahim Halil Yaşar at TFF.org
 
 

1994 births
Living people
People from Şahinbey
Turkish footballers
Gaziantepspor footballers
24 Erzincanspor footballers
Süper Lig players
Association football midfielders